Zannoni is a surname of Italian origin. Notable people with the surname include:

 Davide Zannoni (born 1958), Italian composer
 Giorgia Zannoni (born 1998), Italian volleyball player
 Giuseppe Zannoni (1849–1903), Italian painter
 Torindo Zannoni (1886-1922), Italian Farmer and Hero

See also
 Zanoni (disambiguation)

 
Italian-language surnames
Patronymic surnames
Surnames from given names